ASPI may refer to:

Advanced SCSI Programming Interface, a standardized programming interface for SCSI devices
All Share Price Index, a stock indices of the Colombo Stock Exchange in Sri Lanka
Australian Strategic Policy Institute, a government defence and strategic policy think tank
Asia Society Policy Institute, a non-profit organization that focuses on educating the world about Asia
Autostrade per l'Italia, the largest operator of toll roads in Italy

See also
Aspy (disambiguation)